Tenacibaculum soleae is a bacterium. It is a fish pathogen for some species of sole, brill and turbot, with a particularly high mortality rate. It is Gram-negative, rod-shaped and gliding. Its type strain is LL04 12.1.7T (=CECT 7292T =NCIMB 14368T).

References

Further reading

Lawrence, John M., ed. Sea Urchins: Biology and Ecology. Vol. 38. Academic Press, 2013.
Pavlidis, Michalis, and Constantinos Mylonas, eds. Sparidae: Biology and aquaculture of gilthead sea bream and other species. Wiley. com, 2011.

External links 

WORMS entry
LPSN
Type strain of Tenacibaculum soleae at BacDive -  the Bacterial Diversity Metadatabase

Bacterial diseases of fish
Flavobacteria
Bacteria described in 2008